Ciccio perdona... Io no! (internationally known as Ciccio Forgives, I Don't) is a 1968 Italian comedy film directed by Marcello Ciorciolini starring the comic duo Franco and Ciccio. It is a Spaghetti Western parody of God Forgives... I Don't!.

Cast

 Franco Franchi: Franco
 Ciccio Ingrassia: Ciccio
 Adriano Micantoni: Angel Face
 Fernando Sancho: El Diablo
 Mario Maranzana: Lightning
 Gia Sandri: Calamity Jane
 Luca Sportelli: Barkeeper

References

External links
 

1968 films
1960s buddy comedy films
1960s parody films
1960s Western (genre) comedy films
Films directed by Marcello Ciorciolini
1960s Italian-language films
Italian buddy comedy films
Italian parody films
Spaghetti Western films
1968 comedy films
Films scored by Roberto Pregadio
Italian Western (genre) comedy films
1960s Italian films